Kidderpore Sporting Club is an Indian professional multi-sports club based in the city of Kolkata, West Bengal. Its association football team competes in the Calcutta Football League Premier Division A. They also have a futsal section.

History
Initially starting in the year of 1917, the club was founded by a Britisher Napier McDonald and assumed the current name after Indian independence in 1947. The club used to play its matches at the premises of the Bhukailash Rajbari in Kidderpore, before shifting its current base to the Kolkata Maidan.

Notable players who have played or have started their careers at the club include Sheoo Mewalal, Mangal Purakayastha, Dipu Das, Gautam Sarkar, Surajit Sengupta, Prasun Banerjee, Amit Bagchi. In May 2022, the club roped in Managya Nakarmi from Nepal, their first ever Asian footballer.

Honours
 Bordoloi Trophy
Champions (1): 1987
Runners-up (1): 1970
 Independence Day Cup
Runners-up (1): 2004

See also
Football in Kolkata
List of football clubs in West Bengal

References

Further reading

External links
 Kidderpore SC (Soccerway)
 Kidderpore SC at IFA

Association football clubs established in 1917
1917 establishments in India
Football clubs in Kolkata
Sports clubs in India